The cascabel chili (little bell), also known as the rattle chili, is one of the Mirasol cultivars of the species Capsicum annuum. The 'rattle' and 'bell' designations describe the tendency of loose seeds to rattle inside a dried cascabel when shaken. Fresh cascabel, which is 2–3 cm in diameter, is also known by the alias bola chili or chile bola (Spanish for ball chili). The pigmentation of the fresh chilis blends from green to red; when dried, the color darkens.

Farmers cultivate cascabel in several states throughout Mexico, including Coahuila, Durango, Guerrero, and Jalisco.

See also
List of Capsicum cultivars

References

Chili peppers
Mexican cuisine
Spanish language
Capsicum cultivars